KwikDesk is a computer platform that supports the discreet and secure movement of  data. The founder, Kevin Abosch, a world-renowned visual artist created Kwikdesk as a conceptual art-project to facilitate the anonymous exchange of information through a website, and as a response to trends amongst existing social media platforms. KwikDesk requires no login or password to use. KwikDesk doesn't use cookies and doesn't track IP addresses. Users set a date their submitted kwiks will self-destruct; either 24 hours, or 10 days. The Chinese version of KwikDesk was launched with the participation of human-rights activist and Tiananmen protest leader Wu'erkaixi.

References

External links
Official KwikDesk Website 
KwikDesk Chinese Website

Internet properties established in 2013
Irish websites
Text messaging